Carrianne Leung is a Canadian writer, who won the Danuta Gleed Literary Award in 2019 for her short story collection That Time I Loved You.

Originally from Hong Kong, Leung moved to Canada in childhood, and grew up in the Scarborough district of Toronto, Ontario. She completed a degree in sociology and equity studies at the Ontario Institute for Studies in Education, and has taught at OCAD University.

She is a two-time Toronto Book Award nominee, receiving nods in 2014 for her novel The Wondrous Woo and in 2018 for That Time I Loved You.

References

External links

21st-century Canadian novelists
21st-century Canadian short story writers
21st-century Canadian women writers
Canadian women novelists
Canadian women short story writers
Canadian writers of Asian descent
Hong Kong emigrants to Canada
Writers from Toronto
Living people
Year of birth missing (living people)